The Distrito Nacional is the female volleyball team of Distrito Nacional.

History
The team was found in 2007.

Current volleyball squad
As of December 2008

Coach:  Wilson Sánchez

Assistant coach:  Wagner Pacheco

Palmares

National competition 
National league: 2

References

League Official website

Dominican Republic volleyball clubs
Volleyball clubs established in 2007